Trova Boni (born 21 December 1999) is a Burkinabé footballer who plays as a midfielder for Portuguese club Belenenses SAD.

Career statistics

Club

Notes

International

References

1999 births
Living people
Burkinabé footballers
Burkinabé expatriate footballers
Burkina Faso international footballers
Association football midfielders
K.V. Mechelen players
Varzim S.C. players
Belenenses SAD players
Burkinabé Premier League players
Belgian Pro League players
Primeira Liga players
Sportspeople from Ouagadougou
Burkinabé expatriate sportspeople in Belgium
Expatriate footballers in Belgium
Burkinabé expatriate sportspeople in Portugal
Expatriate footballers in Portugal
21st-century Burkinabé people